Naples Sings (Italian: ...e Napoli canta!) is a 1953 Italian musical melodrama film  directed by Armando Grottini, starring Virna Lisi.

The film's sets were designed by Alfredo Montori.

Plot 
1935: a rich nobleman, in order not to compromise the marriage of her daughter to an English nobleman, takes her newborn daughter from her (had from a clandestine affair), entrusting her to her nuns with a medal of the Madonna around her neck.

1953: Giorgio with some friends rehearses a show of Neapolitan songs financed thanks to an elderly artist. Having come to quarrel with the landlady, Giorgio rented a room with a good woman who lives with her beautiful daughter Maria. Love soon arises between the two. When, thanks to a farsighted entrepreneur, things are going for the best, Mary's mother is summoned by the nuns: a woman has finally learned the truth about her daughter who was stolen from her 18 years earlier and entrusted to the nuns: now she claims the his own daughter, that is, Mary. The girl moves to her birth mother and, attending parties and attending nobles, she becomes engaged to a young scion but never forgetting her Giorgio with whom she secretly meets. In the meantime, the show of these is a great success, but Giorgio has lost all enthusiasm: Maria is getting married, But right on the altar, under the eyes of the two mothers, Maria finds the courage to say no, to rejoin Giorgio.

Cast

References

External links

1950s musical drama films
Italian musical drama films
1953 films
1950s Italian-language films
Films set in Naples
1953 drama films
Italian black-and-white films
Melodrama films
1950s Italian films